Uilson de Souza Paula Júnior (born 27 April 1989), commonly known as Júnior Caiçara, is a Brazilian footballer who last played as a full-back for Süper Lig side İstanbul Başakşehir.

Career

Santo André and loans
Caiçara's first professional club is Santo André. In 2009, after making his senior debut with their B-team in the previous year's Copa Paulista, he was loaned out to Brazilian team CSA.

Back to Santo André in May 2009, Júnior Caiçara made his Série A debut on 16 May, starting and being sent off in a 4–2 away win over Coritiba. In 2010, he was sent on loan to América-SP, where he featured in four Campeonato Paulista Série A2 matches before being released on 10 February.

In June 2010, Caiçara goes to Portugal team Gil Vicente again on loan from Santo André. He made his debut on 29 August against Trofense in the second Portugal league. He helped his team to gain promotion in the Primeira Liga and played with the team in their return in Primeira Liga.

Ludogorets Razgrad
After playing two seasons for Gil Vicente in Portugal, Júnior Caiçara joined Bulgarian side Ludogorets Razgrad on 5 June 2012. He signed a three-year contract and was given the number 80 jersey.

On 11 July, Caiçara marked his debut for Ludogorets with a goal and first trophy. He opened the scoring in the 2012 Bulgarian Supercup against Lokomotiv Plovdiv, the match ended 3–1 to Ludogorets. On 18 July, he made his European debut against Dinamo Zagreb in the second qualifying round of the Champions League. Then he made his Bulgarian A Group debut, playing full 90 minutes in a 3–0 away win over Cherno More Varna on 11 August. Caiçara quickly established himself as Ludogorets's first choice right-back, making 28 league appearances during his debut campaign in Bulgaria. He collected his first A group title winner's medal at the end of the 2012–13 season.

On 21 August 2013, Caiçara was sent off against Basel in a 4–2 home defeat in the play-off round of the Champions League, his first red card in a Ludogorets shirt.

On 12 December 2014, Ludogorets announced that Caiçara had extended his contract with a new two-year deal that will keep him at the club until 2017.

Schalke 04
On 25 June 2015, Caiçara signed with German club Schalke 04 on a three-year deal for a fee of €4.5 million. He made his Bundesliga debut in a 1–1 draw with Darmstadt 98.

İstanbul Başakşehir
On 16 January 2017, Caiçara signed with Turkish club İstanbul Başakşehir F.K. on a 3.5-year deal for an undisclosed fee. Three days later he made his debut for the team in the Turkish Cup coming as a substitute in the 61 minute in a match against Yeni Amasyaspor. On 22 January, he completed his debut for the team coming as a substitute again in a match against Fenerbahçe in the Süper Lig.

International career
Caicara is eligible for both Brazil and Bulgaria since on 1 July 2014 he got a Bulgarian passport and became able to play for Bulgaria from 2017. He said that he would be happy to represent Bulgaria on the international level. On 25 February 2017, he mentioned again that he would represent Bulgaria if he got an invite since the old manager, Ivaylo Petev, wanted him, but he is waiting for a call from Petar Hubchev now.

Career statistics

Honours

Club
Gil Vicente
Liga de Honra: 2010–11
Taça da Liga Runner-up: 2011–12

Ludogorets Razgrad
Bulgarian A Group: 2012–13, 2013–14, 2014–15
Bulgarian Cup: 2013–14
Bulgarian Supercup: 2012

İstanbul Başakşehir
Süper Lig: 2019–20

References

External links

1989 births
Living people
Footballers from São Paulo (state)
Brazilian footballers
América Futebol Clube (SP) players
Gil Vicente F.C. players
PFC Ludogorets Razgrad players
FC Schalke 04 players
İstanbul Başakşehir F.K. players
Liga Portugal 2 players
Primeira Liga players
First Professional Football League (Bulgaria) players
Süper Lig players
Association football defenders
Brazilian expatriate footballers
Expatriate footballers in Bulgaria
Brazilian emigrants to Bulgaria
Naturalised citizens of Bulgaria
Expatriate footballers in Germany
Expatriate footballers in Turkey